Colin Mackay is currently Political Editor for STV News  and occasional relief presenter of Scotland Tonight. 
Mackay Joined STV in 2015 replacing Claire Stewart. Prior to this Mackay worked for Bauer Radio for 16 years as their Scottish Political Editor.

In 2007 Mackay won "News Reporter of the Year award" at the Independent Radio News Awards; Mackay said: “I’m honoured to receive and I’m extremely flattered to be recognised in such a category.”

Mackay became Political Editor of STV News in 2019, taking over the role from Bernard Ponsonby, who became Special Correspondent.

References

Living people
Place of birth missing (living people)
Scottish journalists
Scottish television presenters
STV News newsreaders and journalists
Year of birth missing (living people)